Leinster Lightning was formed in 2013 and became a Twenty20 team in 2017. They played their first Twenty20 match in the 2017 Inter-Provincial Trophy against North West Warriors. In total, 31 players have appeared in Twenty20 cricket for Leinster Lightning, with only Simi Singh and Lorcan Tucker featuring in all of Leinster Lightnings Twenty20 fixtures.

Players are initially listed in order of appearance; where players made their debut in the same match, they are initially listed by batting order.

Key

List of Twenty20 cricketers

See also
List of Leinster Lightning first-class players
List of Leinster Lightning List A players

References

Leinster Lightning
Cricketers, Twenty20